Adjinga is a genus of beetles in the family Cerambycidae, containing a single species, Adjinga vittata. It was described by Pic in 1926.

References

Desmiphorini
Beetles described in 1926
Monotypic Cerambycidae genera